Gerald Cranston's Lady is a melodramatic novel by the British writer Gilbert Frankau which was first published in 1924. It portrays the marriage of an ambitious financier to a well-connected woman in an attempt to boost his social standing. The result is a loveless marriage in which both develop an interest in other people, until eventually being reconciled.

Adaptation
The same year of the novel's release, it was adapted into an American silent film Gerald Cranston's Lady by Fox Film. It retained the English setting of the original story.

References

Bibliography
 Solomon, Aubrey. The Fox Film Corporation, 1915-1935: A History and Filmography. McFarland, 2011.

External links
Copy of 1924 American edition at hathitrust.org

1924 British novels
Novels set in England
British novels adapted into films
Novels by Gilbert Frankau